Edmond Leclere (25 January 1912 – 24 March 1986) was a French basketball player. He competed in the men's tournament at the 1936 Summer Olympics.

References

External links
 

1912 births
1986 deaths
French men's basketball players
Olympic basketball players of France
Basketball players at the 1936 Summer Olympics
Sportspeople from Ardennes (department)